Cherry Street is a street in Tai Kok Tsui, Kowloon, Hong Kong. It was a street to Tai Kok Tsui Ferry Pier. After the reclamation of the West Kowloon in 1990s, it became a road across the new reclamation and a tunnel was built under the Olympic station.

The name of street, cherry, like other streets in Tai Kok Tsui, was named after different kinds of trees.

The construction shaft of the Guangzhou–Shenzhen–Hong Kong Express Rail Link is also located there.

See also
 List of streets and roads in Hong Kong

External links

Google Maps of Cherry Street

Tai Kok Tsui
Roads in Kowloon